Dahaneh Sar-e Shijan (also Romanized as Dahaneh Sar-e Shījān; also known as Dahaneh Sar and Dahaneh Sar-e Sheykhān) is a village in Chapar Khaneh Rural District, Khomam District, Rasht County, Gilan Province, Iran. At the 2006 census, its population was 1,085, in 313 families.

References 

Populated places in Rasht County